Ýewgeniý Naboýçenko (born 17 May 1970), also spelled Eygeniy Naboychenko, is a Turkmen football goalkeeper who played for Turkmenistan in the 2004 AFC Asian Cup. He also played for Kairat Almaty, Almaty, Megasport and Astana. Following his playing career, Kafanov Naboychenko a goalkeeping coach in Aktobe.

References

External links
 
Football Database Profile

1970 births
Living people
Sportspeople from Ashgabat
Soviet footballers
Turkmenistan footballers
Turkmenistan expatriate footballers
Turkmenistan international footballers
Expatriate footballers in Kazakhstan
Turkmenistan expatriate sportspeople in Kazakhstan
Association football goalkeepers
FK Köpetdag Aşgabat players
FC Kairat players
Turkmenistan people of Ukrainian descent
FC Megasport players